The Yeongyang Cheon clan is one of the Korean clans. Their Bon-gwan is in Ningyang County, Tai'an, Shandong, China, known as Yeongyang in Korean. According to the research held in 2015, the number of Yeongyang Cheon clan’s member was 100014. Then, he founded the Yeongyang Cheon clan.

See also 
 Korean clan names of foreign origin

References

External links 
 

 
Korean clan names of Chinese origin
Cheon clans